Cassia queenslandica, the yellow shower, is a species of plant in the family Fabaceae. It is found only in Queensland, Australia. The attractive yellow flowers offer horticultural potential for this species.

References

queenslandica
Flora of Queensland
Plants described in 1939